Fatuma Abdullahi Insaniya is a Somali diplomat. She is the Ambassador of Somalia to the United States, based at the Somali embassy in Washington, D.C. Appointed on 2 April 2015, she is the first woman to be assigned to the office, she hails from Dir sub clan of Surre

References

Living people
Ambassadors of Somalia to the United States
Somalian women diplomats
Year of birth missing (living people)
Women ambassadors